Holzbach may refer to:

 Holzbach, a municipality in the Rhein-Hunsrück-Kreis in Rhineland-Palatinate, Germany

Rivers of Baden-Württemberg, Germany
Holzbach (Soppenbach), left tributary of the Soppenbach

Rivers of Hesse, Germany
Holzbach (Diemel), left tributary of the Diemel
Holzbach (Elbbach, Hadamar), left tributary of the Elbbach in Hadamar
Holzbach (Elbbach, Gemünden), left tributary of the Elbbach in Gemmünden
Holzbach (Schweinfe), right tributary of the Schweinfe
Holzbach (Usa), right tributary of the Usa

Rivers of North Rhine-Westphalia, Germany
Holzbach (Ahse), left tributary of the Ahse
Holzbach (Auelsbach), left tributary of the Auelsbach
Holzbach (Belgenbach), left tributary of the Belgenbach
Holzbach (Dickopsbach), right tributary of the Dickopsbach
Holzbach (Ems), left tributary of the Ems
Holzbach (Emscher), right tributary of the Emscher
Holzbach (Erft), right tributary of the Erft
Holzbach (Finkenbach), right tributary of the Finkenbach

Rivers of Saarland, Germany
Holzbach (Hochwald), in the Schwarzwälder Hochwald